Xiangxian may refer to the following places in China:

Xiangxian, Guangxi (巷贤), a town in Shanglin County, Guangxi
Xiangcheng County, Henan, formerly known as Xiangxian (襄縣), a county in Henan

See also
Xiangxiang, a city in Hunan, China
Xianxian or Xian County, a county in Hebei, China